NDB may refer to:
 Do not let Belgrade drown (Ne davimo Beograd), a political party in Serbia
 Nachrichtendienst des Bundes ("Federal Intelligence Service"), one of the Swiss intelligence agencies
 National Defense Battalions (Iraq) (1961–2003), Iraqi Kurdish paramilitary units
 National Development Bank, a government bank to finance development projects
 NDB Cluster, a database storage engine
 Next DB, an alternate Python client library for the Google App Engine datastore
 Nerima Daikon Brothers, an anime series
 Neue Deutsche Biographie, a German reference work
 New Development Bank, a development bank jointly operated by the BRICS nations
 Non-directional beacon, a fixed radio transmitter used as a navigational aid
 Nuclear depth bomb, a naval weapon

See also
 NNDB, the Notable Names Database